Höryda is a village in Karlskrona Municipality, Blekinge County, southeastern Sweden. It is surrounded by the Blekinge forest.

References

Populated places in Karlskrona Municipality